This is a list of the British Residents of Malay State of Perak, British Malaya. The position of Resident was an administrative post. By the terms of the Pangkor Treaty, the Resident was an adviser to His Highness Sultan of Perak whose decisions were binding in all matters in administration except for Malay customs and religion. The British Resident post is also equivalent with today's Menteri Besar post, where he was the chairman of the Perak State Council and the Sultan was the Lord President of the Council. The official residence for the Resident was at the Residency Hill, Taiping. Other residences were also available in Kuala Kangsar and Ipoh. After World War II, the position of British Resident was replaced by a British Adviser. Eventually, when Malaya achieved Independence, the British Adviser post was abolished.

References

British Residential System in Perak

History of Perak
Perak